The Norwegian Association for Women's Rights (NKF) is Norway's oldest and preeminent women's and girls' rights organization and works "to promote gender equality and all women's and girls' human rights through political and legal reform within the framework of liberal democracy." Founded in 1884, NKF is Norway's oldest political organization after the Liberal Party. NKF stands for an inclusive, intersectional and progressive mainstream liberal feminism and has always been open to everyone regardless of gender. Headquartered at Majorstuen, Oslo, NKF consists of a national-level association as well as regional chapters based in the larger cities, and is led by a national executive board. NKF has had a central role in the adoption of all major gender equality legislation and reforms since 1884. 

NKF aims to represent the interests of all those who identify as girls and women. Its basic principle is that full and equal enjoyment of human rights is due to all girls and women. NKF works for women's political rights, legal equality and representation of women in politics, equal education, working life and economic justice, strengthening women's perspectives in foreign policy and international development, sexual and reproductive rights, ending violence against women, and LGBT+ rights. NKF supports legal protections against discrimination and hate speech on the basis of sexual orientation, gender identity and gender expression.

NKF was founded on the initiative of Gina Krog and Hagbart Berner by 171 prominent women and men of the progressive liberal establishment, including five Norwegian Prime Ministers, and was modeled after the predecessors of the League of Women Voters in the U.S. From the early years the association worked to bring women into the political mainstream. Traditionally the most important association of the Norwegian bourgeois-liberal women's rights movement and historically associated with the Liberal Party, NKF is today a big tent coalition with members from the centre-left to the centre-right. The association has always been Norway's most important mainstream feminist organization and has successfully campaigned for women’s right to education, the right to vote, the right to work, the adoption of the 1978 Gender Equality Act, and the establishment of the Gender Equality Ombud. At the behest of NKF and affiliated organizations, Norway became the world's first independent country to introduce women's suffrage in 1913. NKF founded the Norwegian Women's Public Health Association.

In line with its roots in 19th century first-wave liberal feminism, political and legal reform remains its primary focus, and it has always concentrated on lobbying government bodies in a professional way. As a result of its focus on legal reform, the association has always attracted many lawyers and other academics. NKF members had key roles in developing the government apparatus and legislation related to gender equality in Norway; during the 1970s, the "Norwegian government adopted NKF's [equality] ideology as its own", and NKF's political tradition is closely linked to the concept of state feminism. In foreign policy NKF has a liberal internationalist outlook and generally supports Norwegian official foreign policy. Starting with the presidency of Eva Kolstad, from 1956, NKF focused strongly on the United Nations, and NKF members have been appointed to key UN bodies including UNCSW and the CEDAW Committee; the CEDAW convention remains an important focus of NKF. NKF is a member of the International Alliance of Women (IAW), which has general consultative status to the United Nations Economic and Social Council and participatory status with the Council of Europe, and is also generally considered as a sister organization of the National Organization for Women. NKF's logo is a stylized sunflower, adopted in 1894, based on the model of the liberal American suffrage movement.

History

The Norwegian Association for Women's Rights was founded in 1884 by 171 prominent Norwegians, led by the liberal politician and women's rights pioneer Gina Krog and liberal Member of Parliament and the first editor-in-chief of Dagbladet Hagbart Berner. It was modeled after the American National Woman Suffrage Association, the predecessor of the League of Women Voters. The organization's founders included 87 men and 84 women, overwhelmingly prominent liberal public figures.

From its establishment, the organization was strongly associated with the Liberal Party; its 171 founders included five Norwegian Prime Ministers, several leaders of the Liberal Party, and many liberal Members of Parliament, as well as the editors of the large liberal newspapers and public figures such as novelist Alexander Kielland. Three of the first Presidents of the organization, Anna Stang, Randi Blehr, and Fredrikke Marie Qvam, were all wives of Norwegian Prime Ministers. NKF grew out of overlapping milieus connected to the political elite and liberal media in Norway, particularly the women's rights association Skuld that had been founded the previous year by the first women to pursue higher education in Norway, but also Læseforening for Kvinder (founded by Camilla Collett in 1874), Nissen's Girls' School, Kristiania Lærerindeforening, the influential political and cultural magazine Nyt Tidsskrift,  and the liberal newspaper Dagbladet. Membership has always been open to both women and men, and among the board members in the first years were several prominent lawyers such as the conservative prime minister Francis Hagerup and the attorney-general Annæus Johannes Schjødt. Historian Aslaug Moksnes has noted that NKF is a women's rights organization, not a women's organization; the distinction has always been important to NKF. 

NKF is traditionally the main bourgeois or liberal women's rights organization in Norway. Cathrine Holst noted that "the bourgeois women's rights movement was liberal or liberal feminist. The bourgeois women's rights advocates fought for women’s civil liberties and rights: freedom of speech, freedom of movement, the right to vote, freedom of association, inheritance rights, property rights and freedom of trade – and for women's access to education and working life. In short, women should have the same freedoms and rights as men."

Among the important causes that the NKF has campaigned for are women's suffrage (achieved in 1913), the right to work (in the 1930s), abolishment of the common taxing for spouses (the 1950s), right to equal schooling (the 1960s), the establishment of the Gender Equality Council in 1972, the Gender Equality Ombud in 1978, and the adoption of the Gender Equality Act (1979). The government apparatus concerned with gender equality, including both the Gender Equality Council and the Gender Equality Ombud, were largely built by NKF members.

Key NKF members initiated the establishment of the National Association for Women's Suffrage and the Norwegian National Women's Council. NKF inherited the former's founding membership in the International Alliance of Women (IAW) in 1937.

The association also initiated the establishment of the Norwegian Women's Public Health Association, a humanitarian organization, which grew to become Norway's largest women's organization with around 250,000 members at one point. Historically, NKF was the most important association of the Norwegian bourgeois-liberal women's movement (associated chiefly with the Liberal Party), in contrast to the labour women's movement (associated with the Labour Party), and was traditionally dominated by liberal women from the upper and educated middle class, as well as by liberal men. With the increasing reformism of the Labour Party, many Labour politicians joined NKF in the postwar era. Today, NKF is a nonpartisan organization.

The 1936 bylaws described NKF's main aim as "women's full equality with men in state and society" and NKF's working methods as influencing legislative processes, cooperating with the government and influencing public opinion.

During the presidency of Eva Kolstad (1956–1968), NKF became strongly involved in international cooperation through the United Nations and contributed significantly to early UN gender equality policies, and Kolstad was elected as a member and vice chair of the United Nations Commission on the Status of Women in 1968, the year she stepped down as NKF President, after being nominated as the joint candidate of the Nordic governments. Kolstad later became a cabinet minister in Norway, the leader of the Liberal Party, and then the world's first Gender Equality Ombud. During the 1970s and 1980s, the lawyers Karin M. Bruzelius and Sigrun Hoel led the organization. Bruzelius became the first woman to head a government ministry as Permanent Secretary in 1989 and later became a Supreme Court Justice. Hoel served as the deputy Gender Equality Ombud during Kolstad's tenure and as acting Gender Equality Ombud.

In the early 1980s, NKF was responsible for the government-funded information campaign "Women and the election". In the late 1980s, NKF initiated the TV-aksjonen campaign to raise funds for "Women in the Third World", and NKF co-founded the campaign's successor Forum for Women and Development in 1995. During the presidency of diplomat and psychologist Torild Skard (2006–2013), the former Chairman of UNICEF, NKF renewed its focus on the United Nations, and NKF initiated the establishment of the Norwegian Women's Lobby, the umbrella organization of the Norwegian women's movement. Skard was succeeded as President by Professor Margunn Bjørnholt in 2013, by the Norwegian Parliament's First Vice President Marit Nybakk in 2016, by Supreme Court Justice Karin M. Bruzelius in 2018, and by Professor Anne Hege Grung in 2020.

The organization had its offices in Sehesteds gate 1 in Oslo for many years and now has its offices in Majorstuveien 39 at Majorstuen in central Oslo.

NKF differed markedly from the second-wave feminist movement in its liberal and moderate political outlook, formal style of organization, emphasis on cooperation with the government and focus on legal and policy issues, and also in its membership dominated by lawyers and academics, prioritization of professional lobbying methods and lack of interest in grassroots activism. Elisabeth Lønnå describes NKF by 1970 as "an almost dignified organization" that had its "origins in the Liberal Party and had a liberal platform, centered on the main idea of equality for all citizens and based on the idea of fundamental human rights". Lønnå notes that NKF had long traditions, a clearly defined form of organization, an established network, well formulated policies and principles, and that it spent most of its resources on lobbying government bodies in a professional way. According to Lønnå it was the "only feminist organization that was primarily based on the idea of gender equality". In contrast to the many new feminist organizations that sprung up in the 1970s but quickly lost most of their membership, NKF was strengthened in the 1980s. The government's gender equality apparatus viewed NKF as its main civil society partner and recognised the association's historical role in spearheading the struggle for equality.

NKF has traditionally referred to its political platform as kvinnesak, a term that in this context means women's rights and that has always been associated with the liberal women's rights movement in Norway. However, supreme court justice and two-time NKF President Karin M. Bruzelius has noted that NKF has always used the term women's rights synonymously with the struggle for gender equality, the association's overarching aim since the 19th century. NKF expressed scepticism towards the term "feminism" as late as 1980 because it could foster "unnecessary antagonism towards men", but accepted the term some years later as it became the mainstream general term for the women's rights struggle in the western world. Today the tradition that NKF represents is generally known as liberal feminism in English. NKF works to represent the interests of all those who identify as women and girls.

Although it grew out of 19th century progressive liberalism, NKF, like modern liberal feminism itself, is not limited to liberalism in a modern party-political sense, and NKF is non-partisan and broadly representative of the democratic political spectrum from the centre-left to the centre-right; its members tend to be affiliated with parties like the social-liberal Liberal Party, the social democratic Labour Party, the reformist socialist Socialist Left Party, the centrist Green Party, the liberal-conservative Conservative Party, or the Centre Party. NKF seeks the centre ground and to speak for the majority of people who identify as women, and NKF has always sought broad political support among women and men for reforms aimed at improving women's rights, believing its nonpartisan approach is the most effective way to advocate for women's rights and obtain practical results. Norwegian supreme court justice and two-time NKF President Karin Maria Bruzelius has described NKF's liberal feminism as "a realistic, sober, practical feminism".

While NKF was modeled after a predecessor of the League of Women Voters in the U.S., it is also generally seen as the Norwegian counterpart of the National Organization for Women in the U.S.

International work and affiliations
The United Nations has been a major focus of NKF since the presidency of Eva Kolstad starting in 1956. NKF is a member of the International Alliance of Women (IAW), having inherited the founding membership of its de facto subsidiary, the National Association for Women's Suffrage. IAW was the fourth organization to receive  general consultative status with the United Nations Economic and Social Council in 1947. In its international work, particularly at the UN level, NKF cooperates with its sister organizations in the IAW family such as the Icelandic Women's Rights Association, the Danish Women's Society, the Fredrika Bremer Association, the Deutscher Frauenring and the All India Women's Conference. Several NKF members have served on the IAW international board, notably including NKF presidents Margarete Bonnevie, Eva Kolstad, Clara Ottesen, Karin M. Bruzelius and Margunn Bjørnholt. NKF was a founding member of the Joint Organization of Nordic Women's Rights Associations in 1916, and still cooperates with the other Nordic national women's rights associations through IAW.

Policies

Basic vision: Gender equality

NKF is traditionally the main bourgois-liberal women's rights organization in Norway and applies a human rights approach to its work for gender equality. Today NKF stands for an inclusive, intersectional and progressive liberal feminism and works "to promote gender equality and women's and girls' human rights through political and legal reform within the framework of liberal democracy." NKF describes itself as "an inclusive and non-partisan feminist organization made up of women and men who champion the rights of all girls and women." NKF's main focus is women's political, legal, and human rights, and Harriet Bjerrum Nielsen notes that NKF has "always been liberal and involved in a broad range of issues." NKF focuses on "eliminating attitudes, laws and regulations that are discriminatory towards women and girls and which prevent gender equality".

NKF President Margarete Bonnevie said that NKF will work for solutions that are in the best interest of all women and society, "be the captain who keeps a steady course" in the struggle for equality and "set out the main policy objectives and seek to get the government, parliament and local government bodies to implement the reforms that are required;" accordingly NKF views itself as the leader of the women's movement and struggle for equality in Norway. NKF views gender equality as a human right and argues that women's rights and human rights for all are fundamentally the same issue. NKF has always understood the struggle for women's rights to be identical with the struggle for gender equality, the association's overarching aim since the 19th century.

Core issues

NKF focuses on women's political rights, legal equality and representation of women in politics, equal education, working life and economic justice, strengthening women's perspectives in foreign policy and international development, sexual and reproductive rights, ending violence against women, and LGBT+ rights.

Political rights, legal equality and representation of women in politics
Political rights, legal equality and representation of women in politics is the most important traditional core focus of NKF.

Equal education, working life and economic justice

Equal education, working life and economic justice is the second traditional core focus of NKF.

Foreign policy

NKF's main focus in foreign policy is the strengthening of women's rights. NKF has a strong focus on the United Nations system. NKF played a key role in the development of women-focused development projects and initiated the establishment of what became the Forum for Women and Development. NKF is generally supportive of Norwegian official foreign policy, and in line with its liberal feminist political platform and bourgeois origins, the association maintained a pro-Western stance throughout the Cold War. NKF has never been pacifist; NKF founded the Norwegian Women's Public Health Association, originally intended as an affiliate of the Norwegian Red Cross that aimed to support the Norwegian military in a potential conflict with Sweden during the dissolution of the countries' union in 1905. NKF's non-partisan position meant that NKF consciously adopted a neutral stance on many issues not related to gender equality, especially issues that divided opinion among the political centre in Norway, such as Norwegian membership in the European Union. Clara Ottesen, the NKF President during the membership debate, was herself a member of the executive board of the European Movement in Norway at the time. NKF refused to support anti-nuclear campaigns in Norway from the 1970s, as it would be at odds with official Norwegian (and NATO) security policy during the Cold War, and argued that the issue was unrelated to women's rights.

Sexual and reproductive rights

NKF supports safe and legal abortion, birth control, and reproductive health education for all. NKF initiated the establishment of the NGO Sex og politikk that promotes sexual and reproductive health and rights domestically and internationally. In line with the liberal feminist focus on the "public world"—such as laws, political institutions and working life—NKF originally paid little attention to issues of sexuality, and this gradually changed during the 1960s and 1970s when the issue of abortion became important to the association.

Ending violence against women
NKF has worked to end violence against women since the 19th century. Since the 1980s the topic has become increasingly important for NKF. NKF has mostly focused on legal regulation of violence, and works closely with lawyers and scholars in the field of women's law. NKF shares the mainstream/liberal feminist perspective on prostitution; Alan Soble notes that "contemporary liberal feminists object to prostitution and pornography primarily because much of it involves coercion and choices that are not autonomous." NKF worked to abolish the practice of government-sanctioned prostitution in the 19th century. In the 21st century NKF supported the ban on buying sexual services in Norway. In line with its pragmatic perspective and emphasis on human rights, NKF has also been willing to listen to different perspectives in this complex area, with a main focus on combating human trafficking and exploitation.

LGBT+ rights
NKF is part of the liberal women's rights movement and thus shares the mainstream feminist position on LGBT+ rights. NKF views LGBT+ rights as an integral part of feminism and the human rights framework NKF's work is based on, and opposes discrimination based on sexual orientation or gender identity in all areas, including homophobia and transphobia. NKF has always viewed itself as inclusive and non-discriminatory. Then-President Eva Kolstad wrote in 1959 that the struggle for women's rights is "a struggle for the free human" and in the 1960s Kolstad was an early advocate of gay rights. Nevertheless, during the 1970s the association showed little interest in lesbian rights and argued that lesbian issues did not concern NKF. Since the late 20th century NKF has more consistently adopted LGBT+-inclusive policies and an intersectional approach to discrimination. NKF has noted that its main goal has always been a society where no one is discriminated against on the basis of gender, stating that "women's rights and LGBTIQ+ rights go hand in hand." Law professor, CEDAW expert and NKF member Anne Hellum has noted that the CEDAW committee views "women" as a complex and multidimensional category that includes lesbians and trans women, and that both groups are protected by the convention.

NKF supported Norway's Gender Recognition Act of 2016, with NKF President Margunn Bjørnholt stating that the act is a milestone for LGBT+ rights that the women's rights movement welcomes. Anne Hellum, a law professor and NKF member, said the act was necessary for Norway to meet its legal obligations under human rights law and anti-discrimination law, as the previous system discriminated against and violated the human rights of transgender people. NKF also supported legal protections against discrimination and hate speech on the basis of sexual orientation, gender identity and gender expression in the Penal Code in 2018. NKF has stated that "since 1884, [NKF] has understood the struggle for women’s rights as fundamentally the same issue as the struggle for gender equality in society. [NKF] has always been open to all people regardless of gender. [NKF] fights for gender equality and for all those who identify as women and girls." NKF's LGBT+-inclusive views are aligned with its parent organization, the International Alliance of Women (IAW), with its sister organizations in the IAW family including the Danish Women's Society and the Icelandic Women's Rights Association (IWRA), with other equality-oriented mainstream feminist organizations such as its U.S. counterpart, the National Organization for Women, and with the official policies of both Norway and international bodies such as UN Women. During the 2021 session of the United Nations Commission on the Status of Women (CSW) NKF's parent organization, IAW, co-hosted a CSW forum together with the Icelandic Women's Rights Association on how the women's movement could counter "anti-trans voices [that] are becoming ever louder and [that] are threatening feminist solidarity across borders." IWRA has stated that "IWRA works for the rights of all women – feminism without trans women is no feminism at all," while the Danish Women's Society has said that it takes homophobia and transphobia very seriously, that "we support all initiatives that promote the rights of gay and transgender people" and that "we see the LGBTQA movement as close allies in the struggle against inequality and we fight together for a society where gender and sexuality do not limit an individual." NKF's largest chapter, its Oslo branch, noted that "the anti-gender movement is now working systematically in a number of countries and in several international forums to reverse and undermine the rights of both women and sexual minorities" and that the association "stands in solidarity with international women's rights and LGBT+ organizations in the fight against these setbacks."

Presidents
NKF's president is the highest national-level official and chairs the national board (landsstyret) and the executive board (sentralstyret). NKF's presidents have been:

Symbols

NKF's logo is a stylized sunflower. It was adopted in 1894, based on the model of the liberal American suffrage movement led by Elizabeth Cady Stanton and Susan B. Anthony from the 1860s; by the late 19th century, the sunflower had become the main international symbol of women's suffrage. The logo was also used as the logo of NKF's journal Nylænde, edited by Gina Krog. NKF states that the sunflower represents the association's "roots in the first wave of feminism and our systematic work since 1884 to promote gender equality through constructive political reforms within the framework of liberal democracy".

Journals

NKF published the journal Nylænde (New Land) from 1887 to 1927, edited by Gina Krog until her death in 1916 and then by Fredrikke Mørck. Nylænde was the first women's rights journal in Norway and was regarded as one of the most influential political journals of the country in its time. It played a major role in the early women's rights movement and the struggle for women's suffrage. It was also a leading journal of literary criticism; Marius Wulfsberg has stated that "it was Gina Krog and her [Nylænde] reviewers who really made Ibsen famous."

From 1950 to 2016 NKF published the journal Kvinnesaksnytt (Women's Rights News) that included news and analysis of Norwegian and international women's rights issues. The editors of Kvinnesaksnytt included Ingerid Gjøstein Resi, Marit Aarum, Eva Kolstad, Kari Skjønsberg, Karin M. Bruzelius, Torild Skard and Margunn Bjørnholt.

Awards
NKF's highest honour is its honorary membership, which was first awarded to Camilla Collett in 1884. Since 2009, NKF also awards the Gina Krog Prize, named after its founder.

Honorary members

Camilla Collett 1884
 1896
Aasta Hansteen 1906
Gina Krog 1909
Hagbart Berner 1909
 1913
Ragna Nielsen 1914
Fredrikke Marie Qvam 1914
 1914
Anna Rogstad 1914
Francis Hagerup 1914
Alette Ottesen 1919
Harriet Backer 1920
Anna Bugge 1922
Randi Blehr 1923
Otto Blehr 1924
Edvard Isak Hambro Bull 1924
Dorothea Schjoldager 1924
Aadel Lampe 1926
Betzy Kjelsberg 1931
Fredrikke Mørck 1934
Katti Anker Møller 1939
Margarete Bonnevie 1946
Dakky Kiær 1954
Signe Swensson 1954
Eva Kolstad
Ebba Haslund 1995
Berit Ås 2009
 2013
Torild Skard 2014
Gro Harlem Brundtland (2016)
Helga Hernes (2018)

Gina Krog Prize
Since 2009, the association has awarded the Gina Krog Prize, named after its founder Gina Krog.

The prize has been awarded to
Historians Ida Blom, Gro Hagemann, Elisabeth Lønnå,  and Elisabeth Aasen (2009)
Filmmaker Anja Breien (2010)
Tove Smaadahl (2012)
Kirsti Kolle Grøndahl (2014)
Amal Aden (2016)
Nancy Herz, Sofia Nesrine Srour and Amina Bile (2018)
Anne Hellum (2020)

References

Literature

Aslaug Moksnes (1984). Likestilling eller særstilling? Norsk kvinnesaksforening 1884–1913, Gyldendal Norsk Forlag, 296 pages, ISBN 82-05-15356-6
Elisabeth Lønnå (1996). Stolthet og kvinnekamp: Norsk kvinnesaksforenings historie fra 1913, Gyldendal Norsk Forlag, 341 pages, ISBN 8205244952
Norsk kvinnesaksforening gjennom 65 år: 1884–1949, 1950
Dakky Kiær (1978). Norsk kvinnesaksforening i 1930-årene: med tilbakeblikk på tidligere virke og streiflys frem til 1977
Alette Ottesen (1909). Beretning om Norsk kvindesagsforenings 25 aarige virksomhet: 28de juni 1884–28de juni 1909, Norsk Kvindesagsforening, 1909, 16 pages.
Norske kvinder: en oversigt over deres stilling og livsvilkaar i hundredeaaret 1814–1914 (1914), pp. 75–81
Anna Caspari Agerholt (1937). Den norske kvinnebevegelses historie. Oslo: Gyldendal Norsk Forlag.
Norum, Jorun Margrethe Stangnæs (1971). Kvinner i organisasjoner på 1800-tallet: fra 'Skuld' til 'Norsk Kvindesagsforening'. Oslo.
Nylænde (periodical, 1887–1927)
Kvinnesaksnytt (periodical, 1950–2016)

External links

 
Liberal feminist organizations
First-wave feminism
Women's rights organizations
Feminist organisations in Norway
Organizations established in 1884
1884 establishments in Norway
Voter rights and suffrage organizations
Women's suffrage in Norway